Glyphipterix neochorda is a species of sedge moth in the genus Glyphipterix. It was described by Edward Meyrick in 1922. It is found in South America.

References

Moths described in 1922
Glyphipterigidae
Moths of South America